Hauwa Ibrahim (born 1968) is a Nigerian human rights lawyer who won the European Parliament's Sakharov Prize in 2005.

Life 
Ibrahim was born in Gombe in 1968. She was trained to be a lawyer and was considered the first Muslim  woman in Nigeria to achieve this distinction.

Ibrahim was known for pro bono work defending people condemned under the Islamic Sharia laws that are in force in the northern Nigerian provinces. She defended Amina Lawal, Safiya Hussaini and Hafsatu Abubákar. In 2005 she was awarded the Sakharov Prize for this work.

Hauwa has been a Visiting Professor  at Saint Louis University School of Law and Stonehill College, a World Fellow at Yale University, a Radcliffe fellow, and a fellow at both the Human Rights Program and the Islamic Legal Studies Program at Harvard University. Hauwa is presently a teacher and a researcher at Harvard University. She is also one of the 25 leading figures on the Information and Democracy Commission launched by Reporters Without Borders.

While a Radcliffe fellow, Ibrahim adopted an interdisciplinary approach to delve into the theoretical foundations of Shariah law and examine how they have influenced legal practice, which has, in turn, affected the human rights of women in West  Africa . Her research led to the book Practicing Shariah Law: Seven Strategies for Achieving Justice in Shariah Courts, published in January 2013."

See also 

 First women lawyers around the world

References

External links

 Downloadable PDF brochure from the Sakharov Prize ceremony describing the prize, Ibrahim, and her work
 Frontline (US Public Broadcasting program) interview

1968 births
Living people
Nigerian women lawyers
Sakharov Prize laureates
Nigerian human rights activists
Saint Louis University School of Law faculty